Mesnil-en-Ouche (literally Mesnil in Ouche) is a commune in the department of Eure, northern France. The municipality was established on 1 January 2016 by merger of the 16 former communes of Ajou, La Barre-en-Ouche, Beaumesnil (the seat), Bosc-Renoult-en-Ouche, Épinay, Gisay-la-Coudre, Gouttiéres, Granchain, Jonquerets-de-Livet, Landepéreuse, La Roussière, Saint-Aubin-des-Hayes, Saint-Aubin-le-Guichard, Sainte-Marguerite-en-Ouche, Saint-Pierre-du-Mesnil and Thevray.

Population

See also 
Communes of the Eure department

References 

Communes of Eure
Populated places established in 2016
2016 establishments in France
States and territories established in 2016